Richard "Dick" Chrysler (born April 29, 1942) is an Amway distributor and former politician from the U.S. state of Michigan.

Chrysler was born in Saint Paul, Minnesota, and graduated from Brighton High School in Brighton, Michigan. He became vice-president of Hurst Performance and the founder and president of Cars and Concepts (which bought out Hurst), and Richard Chrysler Industries (RCI).

In 1986, he campaigned for governor of Michigan as a Republican, but lost a hard-fought primary to Wayne County Executive William Lucas.

Chrysler lost his first campaign for the United States House of Representatives to Bob Carr in 1992, in a race described as "the most expensive Congressional race in Michigan that cycle." After Carr gave up his seat to run for Senate, however, Chrysler was elected in 1994 as a Republican member of the Amway caucus from Michigan's 8th congressional district to the 104th Congress. He served from January 3, 1995, to January 3, 1997. While in Congress, he sponsored eight bills and co-sponsored 183 more, including the Defense of Marriage Act. He supported the Contract with America, and proposed replacing the federal income tax and capital gains tax with a 15% sales tax. He was defeated by Democrat Debbie Stabenow in the 1996 election for the 105th Congress.

Following his political career, Chrysler returned to the automotive industry, exploring battery technologies for electric vehicles. "We've been getting ready for four years now," he told Crain's Detroit Business in 1996. "It's time to get going. This market is on the verge of exploding."

Electoral history 
1996 Race for U.S. House of Representatives - 8th District
Debbie Stabenow (D), 53.76%
Dick Chrysler (R) (inc.), 44.14%
Doug MacDonald (L), 1.45%
Patricia R. Allen (NL), 0.64%
1994 Race for U.S. House of Representatives - 8th District
Dick Chrysler (R), 51.61%
Bob Mitchell (D), 44.89%
Gerald R. Turcotte, Jr. (L), 2.05%
Susan Ilene McPeak (NL), 1.45%
1992 Race for U.S. House of Representatives - 8th District
Bob Carr (D) (inc.), 47.60%
Dick Chrysler (R), 46.33%
Frank McAlpine (I), 4.27%
Michael E. Marotta, (L), 1.80%
1986 Race for Governor (Republican Primary)
Bill Lucas, 44.50%
Dick Chrysler, 34.03%
Colleen Engler, 10.98%
Dan Murphy, 10.49%

References

The Political Graveyard
 

1942 births
Living people
Politicians from Saint Paul, Minnesota
Republican Party members of the United States House of Representatives from Michigan
Businesspeople from Saint Paul, Minnesota
20th-century American politicians